Taylor Lake is a lake adjacent to Clear Lake, southeast of Houston, Texas, United States near Galveston Bay. The city of Taylor Lake Village lies on its shores within the Clear Lake Area of the Houston-Sugar Land-Baytown metropolitan area.

References
  Texas State Historical Association

Galveston Bay Area
Greater Houston
Geography of Harris County, Texas
Geography of Houston